In nuclear physics, atomic physics, and nuclear chemistry, the nuclear shell model is a model of the atomic nucleus which uses the Pauli exclusion principle to describe the structure of the nucleus in terms of energy levels. The first shell model was proposed by Dmitri Ivanenko (together with E. Gapon) in 1932. The model was developed in 1949 following independent work by several physicists, most notably Eugene Paul Wigner, Maria Goeppert Mayer, and J. Hans D. Jensen, who shared the 1963 Nobel Prize in Physics for their contributions.

The nuclear shell model is partly analogous to the atomic shell model, which describes the arrangement of electrons in an atom, in that a filled shell results in better stability. When adding nucleons (protons or neutrons) to a nucleus, there are certain points where the binding energy of the next nucleon is significantly less than the last one. This observation that there are specific magic quantum numbers of nucleons (2, 8, 20, 28, 50, 82, 126) which are more tightly bound than the following higher number is the origin of the shell model.

The shells for protons and neutrons are independent of each other. Therefore, there can exist both "magic nuclei", in which one nucleon type or the other is at a magic number, and "doubly magic quantum nuclei", where both are. Due to some variations in orbital filling, the upper magic numbers are 126 and, speculatively, 184 for neutrons, but only 114 for protons, playing a role in the search for the so-called island of stability. Some semi-magic numbers have been found, notably Z = 40, which gives the nuclear shell filling for the various elements; 16 may also be a magic number.

In order to get these numbers, the nuclear shell model starts from an average potential with a shape somewhere between the square well and the harmonic oscillator. To this potential, a spin orbit term is added. Even so, the total perturbation does not coincide with experiment, and an empirical spin orbit coupling must be added with at least two or three different values of its coupling constant, depending on the nuclei being studied.

The magic numbers of nuclei, as well as other properties, can be arrived at by approximating the model with a three-dimensional harmonic oscillator plus a spin–orbit interaction. A more realistic but also complicated potential is known as the Woods–Saxon potential.

Modified harmonic oscillator model

Consider a three-dimensional harmonic oscillator. This would give, for example, in the first three levels ("ℓ" is the angular momentum quantum number)

Nuclei are built by adding protons and neutrons. These will always fill the lowest available level, with the first two protons filling level zero, the next six protons filling level one, and so on. As with electrons in the periodic table, protons in the outermost shell will be relatively loosely bound to the nucleus if there are only few protons in that shell, because they are farthest from the center of the nucleus. Therefore, nuclei which have a full outer proton shell will have a higher nuclear binding energy than other nuclei with a similar total number of protons. The same is true for neutrons.

This means that the magic numbers are expected to be those in which all occupied shells are full. In accordance with the experiment, we get 2 (level 0 full) and 8 (levels 0 and 1 full) for the first two numbers. However, the full set of magic numbers does not turn out correctly. These can be computed as follows:

Thus, the magic numbers would befor all integer k. This gives the following magic numbers: 2, 8, 20, 40, 70, 112, ..., which agree with experiment only in the first three entries. These numbers are twice the tetrahedral numbers (1, 4, 10, 20, 35, 56, ...) from the Pascal Triangle.

In particular, the first six shells are:
 level 0: 2 states (ℓ = 0) = 2.
 level 1: 6 states (ℓ = 1) = 6.
 level 2: 2 states (ℓ = 0) + 10 states (ℓ = 2) = 12.
 level 3: 6 states (ℓ = 1) + 14 states (ℓ = 3) = 20.
 level 4: 2 states (ℓ = 0) + 10 states (ℓ = 2) + 18 states (ℓ = 4) = 30.
 level 5: 6 states (ℓ = 1) + 14 states (ℓ = 3) + 22 states (ℓ = 5) = 42.
where for every ℓ there are 2ℓ+1 different values of ml and 2 values of ms, giving a total of 4ℓ+2 states for every specific level.

These numbers are twice the values of triangular numbers from the Pascal Triangle: 1, 3, 6, 10, 15, 21, ....

Including a spin–orbit interaction
We next include a spin–orbit interaction. First we have to describe the system by the quantum numbers j, mj and parity instead of ℓ, ml and ms, as in the hydrogen–like atom. Since every even level includes only even values of ℓ, it includes only states of even (positive) parity. Similarly, every odd level includes only states of odd (negative) parity. Thus we can ignore parity in counting states. The first six shells, described by the new quantum numbers, are
 level 0 (n = 0): 2 states (j = ). Even parity.
 level 1 (n = 1): 2 states (j = ) + 4 states (j = ) = 6. Odd parity.
 level 2 (n = 2): 2 states (j = ) + 4 states (j = ) + 6 states (j = ) = 12. Even parity.
 level 3 (n = 3): 2 states (j = ) + 4 states (j = ) + 6 states (j = ) + 8 states (j = ) = 20. Odd parity.
 level 4 (n = 4): 2 states (j = ) + 4 states (j = ) + 6 states (j = ) + 8 states (j = ) + 10 states (j = ) = 30. Even parity.
 level 5 (n = 5): 2 states (j = ) + 4 states (j = ) + 6 states (j = ) + 8 states (j = ) + 10 states (j = ) + 12 states (j = ) = 42. Odd parity.
where for every j there are  different states from different values of mj.

Due to the spin–orbit interaction the energies of states of the same level but with different j will no longer be identical. Furthermore, the strength of the interaction is roughly proportional to ℓ.

For example, consider the states at level 4:
 The 10 states with j =  come from ℓ = 4 and s parallel to ℓ. Thus they have a positive spin–orbit interaction energy.
 The 8 states with j =  came from ℓ = 4 and s anti-parallel to ℓ. Thus they have a negative spin–orbit interaction energy.
 The 6 states with j =  came from ℓ = 2 and s parallel to ℓ. Thus they have a positive spin–orbit interaction energy. However its magnitude is half compared to the states with j = .
 The 4 states with j =  came from ℓ = 2 and s anti-parallel to ℓ. Thus they have a negative spin–orbit interaction energy. However its magnitude is half compared to the states with j = .
 The 2 states with j =  came from ℓ = 0 and thus have zero spin–orbit interaction energy.

Changing the profile of the potential
The harmonic oscillator potential  grows infinitely as the distance from the center r goes to infinity. A more realistic potential, such as Woods–Saxon potential, would approach a constant at this limit. One main consequence is that the average radius of nucleons' orbits would be larger in a realistic potential; This leads to a reduced term  in the Laplace operator of the Hamiltonian operator. Another main difference is that orbits with high average radii, such as those with high n or high ℓ, will have a lower energy than in a harmonic oscillator potential. Both effects lead to a reduction in the energy levels of high ℓ orbits.

Predicted magic numbers

Together with the spin–orbit interaction, and for appropriate magnitudes of both effects, one is led to the following qualitative picture: At all levels, the highest j states have their energies shifted downwards, especially for high n (where the highest j is high). This is both due to the negative spin–orbit interaction energy and to the reduction in energy resulting from deforming the potential to a more realistic one. The second-to-highest j states, on the contrary, have their energy shifted up by the first effect and down by the second effect, leading to a small overall shift. The shifts in the energy of the highest j states can thus bring the energy of states of one level to be closer to the energy of states of a lower level. The "shells" of the shell model are then no longer identical to the levels denoted by n, and the magic numbers are changed.

Then we get the following shells (see the figure)

 1st shell: 2 states (n = 0, j = ).
 2nd shell: 6 states (n = 1, j =  or ).
 3rd shell: 12 states (n = 2, j = ,  or ).
 4th shell: 8 states (n = 3, j = ).
and so on.

Note that the numbers of states after the 4th shell are doubled triangular numbers . Spin–orbit coupling causes so-called 'intruder levels' to drop down from the next higher shell into the structure of the previous shell. The sizes of the intruders are such that the resulting shell sizes are themselves increased to the very next higher doubled triangular numbers from those of the harmonic oscillator. For example, 1f2p has 20 nucleons, and spin–orbit coupling adds 1g9/2 (10 nucleons) leading to a new shell with 30 nucleons. 1g2d3s has 30 nucleons, and addition of intruder 1h11/2 (12 nucleons) yields a new shell size of 42, and so on.

The magic numbers are then

 2
 
 
 
 
 
 
 

and so on.  This gives all the observed magic numbers, and also predicts a new one (the so-called island of stability) at the value of 184 (for protons, the magic number 126 has not been observed yet, and more complicated theoretical considerations predict the magic number to be 114 instead).

Another way to predict magic (and semi-magic) numbers is by laying out the idealized filling order (with spin–orbit splitting but energy levels not overlapping). For consistency s is split into j = 1⁄2 and j = -1⁄2 components with 2 and 0 members respectively. Taking leftmost and rightmost total counts within sequences marked bounded by / here gives the magic and semi-magic numbers.

 s(2,0)/p(4,2) > 2,2/6,8, so (semi)magic numbers 2,2/6,8
 d(6,4):s(2,0)/f(8,6):p(4,2) > 14,18:20,20/28,34:38,40, so 14,20/28,40
 g(10,8):d(6,4):s(2,0)/h(12,10):f(8,6):p(4,2) > 50,58,64,68,70,70/82,92,100,106,110,112, so 50,70/82,112
 i(14,12):g(10,8):d(6,4):s(2,0)/j(16,14):h(12,10):f(8,6):p(4,2) > 126,138,148,156,162,166,168,168/184,198,210,220,228,234,238,240, so 126,168/184,240

The rightmost predicted magic numbers of each pair within the quartets bisected by / are double tetrahedral numbers from the Pascal Triangle: 2, 8, 20, 40, 70, 112, 168, 240 are 2x 1, 4, 10, 20, 35, 56, 84, 120, ..., and the leftmost members of the pairs differ from the rightmost by double triangular numbers: 2 − 2 = 0, 8 − 6 = 2, 20 − 14 = 6, 40 − 28 = 12, 70 − 50 = 20, 112 − 82 = 30, 168 − 126 = 42, 240 − 184 = 56, where 0, 2, 6, 12, 20, 30, 42, 56, ... are 2 × 0, 1, 3, 6, 10, 15, 21, 28, ... .

Other properties of nuclei
This model also predicts or explains with some success other properties of nuclei, in particular spin and parity of nuclei ground states, and to some extent their excited nuclear states as well. Take  (oxygen-17) as an example: Its nucleus has eight protons filling the three first proton "shells", eight neutrons filling the three first neutron "shells", and one extra neutron. All protons in a complete proton shell have zero total angular momentum, since their angular momenta cancel each other. The same is true for neutrons. All protons in the same level (n) have the same parity (either +1 or −1), and since the parity of a pair of particles is the product of their parities, an even number of protons from the same level (n) will have +1 parity. Thus the total angular momentum of the eight protons and the first eight neutrons is zero, and their total parity is +1. This means that the spin (i.e. angular momentum) of the nucleus, as well as its parity, are fully determined by that of the ninth neutron. This one is in the first (i.e. lowest energy) state of the 4th shell, which is a d-shell (ℓ = 2), and since p = (−1), this gives the nucleus an overall parity of +1.

The rules for the ordering of the nucleus shells are similar to Hund's Rules of the atomic shells, however, unlike its use in atomic physics the completion of a shell is not signified by reaching the next n, as such the shell model cannot accurately predict the order of excited nuclei states, though it is very successful in predicting the ground states. The order of the first few terms are listed as follows: 1s, 1p, 1p, 1d, 2s, 1d... For further clarification on the notation refer to the article on the RussellSaunders term symbol.

For nuclei farther from the magic quantum numbers one must add the assumption that due to the relation between the strong nuclear force and total angular momentum, protons or neutrons with the same n tend to form pairs of opposite angular momenta.  Therefore, a nucleus with an even number of protons and an even number of neutrons has 0 spin and positive parity. A nucleus with an even number of protons and an odd number of neutrons (or vice versa) has the parity of the last neutron (or proton), and the spin equal to the total angular momentum of this neutron (or proton).  By "last" we mean the properties coming from the highest energy level.

In the case of a nucleus with an odd number of protons and an odd number of neutrons, one must consider the total angular momentum and parity of both the last neutron and the last proton.  The nucleus parity will be a product of theirs, while the nucleus spin will be one of the possible results of the sum of their angular momenta (with other possible results being excited states of the nucleus).

The ordering of angular momentum levels within each shell is according to the principles described above – due to spin–orbit interaction, with high angular momentum states having their energies shifted downwards due to the deformation of the potential (i.e. moving from a harmonic oscillator potential to a more realistic one). For nucleon pairs, however, it is often energetically favorable to be at high angular momentum, even if its energy level for a single nucleon would be higher.  This is due to the relation between angular momentum and the strong nuclear force.

Nuclear magnetic moment of neutron and proton is partly predicted by this simple version of the shell model.  The magnetic moment is calculated through j, ℓ and s of the "last" nucleon, but nuclei are not in states of well defined ℓ and s.  Furthermore, for odd-odd nuclei, one has to consider the two "last" nucleons, as in deuterium. Therefore, one gets several possible answers for the nuclear magnetic moment, one for each possible combined ℓ and s state, and the real state of the nucleus is a superposition of them.  Thus the real (measured) nuclear magnetic moment is somewhere in between the possible answers.

The electric dipole of a nucleus is always zero, because its ground state has a definite parity, so its matter density (ψ, where ψ is the wavefunction) is always invariant under parity. This is usually the situations with the atomic electric dipole as well.

Higher electric and magnetic multipole moments cannot be predicted by this simple version of the shell model, for the reasons similar to those in the case of deuterium.

Including residual interactions

For nuclei having two or more valence nucleons (i.e. nucleons outside a closed shell) a residual two-body interaction must be added. This residual term comes from the part of the inter-nucleon interaction not included in the approximative average potential. Through this inclusion, different shell configurations are mixed and the energy degeneracy of states corresponding to the same configuration is broken.

These residual interactions are incorporated through shell model calculations in a truncated model space (or valence space). This space is spanned by a basis of many-particle states where only single-particle states in the model space are active. The Schrödinger equation is solved on this basis, using an effective Hamiltonian specifically suited for the model space. This Hamiltonian is different from the one of free nucleons as it among other things has to compensate for excluded configurations.

One can do away with the average potential approximation entirely by extending the model space to the previously inert core and treating all single-particle states up to the model space truncation as active. This forms the basis of the no-core shell model, which is an ab initio method. It is necessary to include a three-body interaction in such calculations to achieve agreement with experiments.

Collective rotation and the deformed potential
In 1953, the first experimental examples were found of rotational bands in nuclei, with their energy levels following the same J(J+1) pattern of energies as in rotating molecules. Quantum mechanically, it is impossible to have a collective rotation of a sphere, so this implied that the shape of these nuclei was nonspherical. In principle, these rotational states could have been described as coherent superpositions of particle-hole excitations in the basis consisting of single-particle states of the spherical potential. But in reality, the description of these states in this manner is intractable, due to a large number of valence particles—and this intractability was even greater in the 1950s when computing power was extremely rudimentary. For these reasons, Aage Bohr, Ben Mottelson, and Sven Gösta Nilsson constructed models in which the potential was deformed into an ellipsoidal shape. The first successful model of this type is the one now known as the Nilsson model. It is essentially  the harmonic oscillator model described in this article, but with anisotropy added, so that the oscillator frequencies along the three Cartesian axes are not all the same. Typically the shape is a prolate ellipsoid, with the axis of symmetry taken to be z. Because the potential is not spherically symmetric, the single-particle states are not states of good angular momentum J. However, a Lagrange multiplier , known as a "cranking" term, can be added to the Hamiltonian. Usually the angular frequency vector ω is taken to be perpendicular to the symmetry axis, although tilted-axis cranking can also be considered. Filling the single-particle states up to the Fermi level then produces states whose expected angular momentum along the cranking axis  is the desired value.

Related models
Igal Talmi developed a method to obtain the information from experimental data and use it to calculate and predict energies which have not been measured. This method has been successfully used by many nuclear physicists and has led to deeper understanding of nuclear structure. The theory which gives a good description of these properties was developed. This description turned out to furnish the shell model basis of the elegant and successful interacting boson model.

A model derived from the nuclear shell model is the alpha particle model developed by Henry Margenau, Edward Teller, J. K. Pering, T. H. Skyrme, also sometimes called the Skyrme model. Note, however, that the Skyrme model is usually taken to be a model of the nucleon itself, as a "cloud" of mesons (pions), rather than as a model of the nucleus as a "cloud" of alpha particles.

See also

 Interacting boson model
 Isomeric shift
 Liquid drop model
 Nuclear structure

References

Further reading

External links
 

Nuclear physics
German inventions